Harry L. Watson is an American historian of the antebellum American South, Jacksonian America, and the history of North Carolina. He is formerly the Director of the Center for the Study of the American South at the University of North Carolina. He also holds the title of the Atlanta Distinguished Professor in Southern Culture in the Department of History at UNC-Chapel Hill.

Watson is an alumnus of Brown University and received a Ph.D. from Northwestern University in 1976.

Bibliography

References

External links
Homepage at UNC

21st-century American historians
21st-century American male writers
University of North Carolina at Chapel Hill faculty
Brown University alumni
Year of birth missing (living people)
Living people
American male non-fiction writers